The name Ramon has been used for two tropical cyclones in the Eastern Pacific Ocean.

 Hurricane Ramon (1987)
 Tropical Storm Ramon (2017)

The name Ramon has also been used in the Philippines by PAGASA in the Western Pacific.

 Tropical Storm Banyan (2011) (T1120, 23W, Ramon) – struck the Philippines.
 Typhoon Kalmaegi (2019) (T1926, 27W, Ramon)

Pacific hurricane set index articles
Pacific typhoon set index articles